Cheshmeh Darreh or Cheshmeh-ye Darreh or Cheshmehdarreh may refer to:

Cheshmeh Darreh, Fars
Cheshmeh Darreh, Kohgiluyeh and Boyer-Ahmad
Cheshmeh Darreh, Boyer-Ahmad, Kohgiluyeh and Boyer-Ahmad Province
Cheshmeh Darreh, Lorestan